Rhodoblastus  is a genus of bacteria from the order Hyphomicrobiales.

References

Hyphomicrobiales
Bacteria genera